Anthony Braxton (also referred to as  B-Xo/N-0-1-47a or Composition 6g) is an album by Anthony Braxton, released in 1969 on the BYG Actuel label. It features performances by Braxton, violinist Leroy Jenkins, trumpeter  Leo Smith and percussionist Steve McCall.

Reception
The AllMusic review by Scott Yanow states: "The music performed... is very freely improvised, includes 'little instruments' for their variety in sound, and contrasts high-energy playing with space... and is far from accessible but is generally worth the struggle".

Track listing 
All compositions by Anthony Braxton except where noted.
 "The Light on the Dalta" (Leo Smith) - 10:02  
 "Simple Like" (Leroy Jenkins) - 9:23  
 "B-Xo/N-O-1-47a" - 19:36*  
*This track is graphically titled. This is an attempt to translate the title to text.
 Recorded at Saravah Studios, Paris, France on September 10, 1969

Personnel 
 Anthony Braxton - alto saxophone, soprano saxophone, clarinet, contrabass clarinet, flute, chimes, sound machine
 Leroy Jenkins - violin, viola, flute, mouth organ, Hohner organ, harmonica
 Leo Smith - trumpet, flugelhorn, horns, log drum, siren
 Steve McCall - drums, darbouka, percussion

References 

1969 albums
Anthony Braxton albums
BYG Actuel albums